Darko Grubor (16 October 1962 – 2 June 2016) was the general secretary of FK Partizan.

References

  
 

1962 births
2016 deaths
Businesspeople from Belgrade
University of Belgrade Faculty of Law alumni
FK Partizan non-playing staff
Serbian sports executives and administrators
Deaths from cancer in Serbia